was a warrant officer and ace fighter pilot in the Imperial Japanese Navy (IJN) during the Second Sino-Japanese War and the Pacific theater of World War II.  In aerial combat over China and the Pacific he was officially credited with destroying nine enemy aircraft.  As a member of the aircraft carrier Jun'yō's fighter group, Suzuki was killed in action on 26 October 1942 during the Battle of the Santa Cruz Islands.

References

1914 births
1942 deaths
Japanese naval aviators
Japanese World War II flying aces
Military personnel from Fukuoka Prefecture
Japanese military personnel killed in World War II
Imperial Japanese Navy officers
Aviators killed by being shot down